Jack "Jackey" Chatfield is an American politician, businessman, and rancher, currently serving as a member of the New Mexico House of Representatives. Elected in 2019, Chatfield represents the 67th district, which includes Tucumcari, New Mexico, Ute Lake State Park, and Clayton Lake State Park.

Early life 
Chatfield was born in Truth or Consequences, New Mexico.

Career 
Prior to serving in the New Mexico House of Representatives, Chatfield worked as a rancher at Bell Ranch. He currently owns and operates a Headquarters Restaurant in Mosquero, New Mexico. Chatfield took office on January 15, 2019, succeeding Dennis Roch. He is a member of the Republican Party.

Personal life 
Chatfield is married and has five children.

References 

Republican Party members of the New Mexico House of Representatives
People from Truth or Consequences, New Mexico
Ranchers from New Mexico
American restaurateurs
Year of birth missing (living people)
Living people